Kommissar Brahm is a German television series.

See also
List of German television series

External links
 

German crime television series
1967 German television series debuts
1967 German television series endings
German-language television shows
ZDF original programming
1960s German police procedural television series